Archibald Primrose, 1st Earl of Rosebery (1664–1723) was a Scottish politician.

Son of Sir Archibald Primrose, Lord Carrington, he was a Commissioner to the Parliament of Scotland for Edinburgh county from 1695.

He was created Viscount Rosebery (in the Peerage of Scotland) in 1700. He was created Earl of Rosebery on the accession of Queen Anne in 1703. He was a Commissioner for union with England and was a Scottish representative peer in 1707, 1708, 1710 and 1713.

His third daughter, Dorothea Primrose, lived at the head of Blackfriars Wynd on the Royal Mile in Edinburgh to care for her aunt Primrose Campbell, Lady Lovat (the Earl's sister) the widow of the executed Lord Lovat.

References

1661 births
1723 deaths
Earls of Rosebery
Shire Commissioners to the Parliament of Scotland
Members of the Parliament of Scotland 1689–1702
Members of the Parliament of Scotland 1702–1707
Scottish representative peers
Primrose, Archibald
Politicians from Edinburgh
Peers of Scotland created by William II
Archibald